Sikhs are a religious minority in Italy, which has the second biggest Sikh population in Europe after the United Kingdom. Estimates vary; many sources such as the Economic Times India place it around 220,000. In Vicenza, there are 1,000. According to an investigation conducted by the Corriere della Sera, the total number is 70,000, while some scholars tend to downsize it, double it or even triple it;   the ISMU foundation, based on the Italian National Institute of Statistics and ORIM data (Regional Observatory for Integration and Multi-Ethnicity), provides a much lower figure of about 7,000 people in 2016 (referring to persons who have not acquired Italian citizenship) 

There are about 12 gurdwaras across the country - the oldest one being in Reggio Emilia in northern Italy where many members of the community are engaged  in agricultural work. They mostly belong to the Lubana community (merchant caste of India).

Gurdwaras
Sri Guru Hargobind Sahib Sewa Society
Gurdwara Singh Sabha
Sri Gurdwara Singh Sabha
 Baba makhan shah Lubana Gurudwara Alessandria

References

External links
European Journal: Sikhs in the Po Valley

Religion in Italy
Italy
Ita